Damian Gregory (born January 21, 1977) is a former American football defensive tackle. He played for the Miami Dolphins in 2001, the Cleveland Browns in 2002 and for the Tampa Bay Buccaneers in 2004.

References

1977 births
American football defensive tackles
Cleveland Browns players
living people
Miami Dolphins players
players of American football from Ann Arbor, Michigan
Tampa Bay Buccaneers players